Sergio Aurelio Micco Aguayo (born 12 November 1963) is a Chilean politician and public administrator who currently serves as a head of the National Institute of Human Rights of Chile.

References

External links
 

1963 births
Living people
20th-century Chilean lawyers
Christian Democratic Party (Chile) politicians
21st-century Chilean politicians
University of Concepción alumni
21st-century Chilean lawyers